León Rodrigo Krauze Turrent (Mexico City, January 4, 1975) is a Mexican journalist, author, and news anchor.

Personal life 

He is the son of Enrique Krauze and is married with children. Krauze holds a master's degree from New York University.

Career 

He began his career as a sports journalist, focusing on football. That passion led him to become not only an expert and official chronicler of the Mexico national team but also a highly regarded historian: he has written four books and eighty documentaries on the history of “fútbol” in Mexico.

Since 1997, Krauze has covered politics in the United States, for both American and Mexican media outlets. In 2005 he published “La Casa Dividida,” an account of the first five years of the Bush presidency.  Krauze has interviewed leading political figures such as Juan Manuel Santos, Nick Clegg, Felipe Calderón, Enrique Peña Nieto, Shimon Peres, and Barack Obama.

His work has been published in Foreign Affairs, The New Republic, Foreign Policy, Newsweek, Los Angeles Times, El País, and Letras Libres. Currently, he is a contributor at The Daily Beast, a weekly columnist for Mexico’s El Universal, and hosts the Gabfest en Español podcast for Slate.  he has been a professor of journalism at the USC Annenberg School.

For five years, Krauze hosted “Segunda Emisión”, Mexico’s highest rated afternoon radio newsmagazine. Upon moving to television, Krauze quickly became a success as well, anchoring “Hora 21”, the main newscast for Foro TV, Televisa’s 24/7 news network. Krauze was the main anchor at Univision’s Los Angeles station, KMEX serving for 10 years, his last broadcast was January 14, 2022 and starting January 24th will join Univision national news out of Miami alongside Patricia Janiot. Krauze also hosts a daily political commentary radio show on Univision's Los Angeles flagship talk radio KTNQ, called "En boca de León" ("In the Lion's Mouth").<ref Insideradio: Univision Relaunches L.A.’s KTNQ With 14 Hours of Local Talk. Sep 13, 2019</ref>  He’s also a regular at Fusion, where he hosted the show "Open Source".

Published Work 
”El Vuelo de Eluán”, FCE, México, 2005.
”La Casa Dividida”, Planeta, México, 2005.
"La Mesa - Historias de Nuestra Gente", HarperCollins, 2016

References

External links 

Letras Libres Magazine
W Radio
Milenio Newspaper
Twitter account
"W Radio" clip
León Krauze interview by "Exa TV"

Jewish writers
Mexican Jews
Mexican people of Polish-Jewish descent
Mexican male writers
Mexican columnists
Writers from Mexico City
Living people
1975 births
New York University alumni